Thomas Anthony Welch (November 2, 1884 – September 9, 1959) was an American prelate of the Roman Catholic Church. He served as Bishop of Duluth from 1926 until his death in 1959.

Biography

Early life 
Thomas Welch was born on November 2, 1884, in Faribault, Minnesota, to Thomas J. and Ellen (née Deasy) Welch. He studied at College of St. Thomas and St. Paul Seminary, both in St. Paul, Minnesota. He was ordained to the priesthood for the  Archdiocese of St. Paul and Minneapolis on June 11, 1909.

Welch served as secretary to Archbishop John Ireland (1909–1918) and to his successor, Archbishop Austin Dowling (1919–1922). He also served as chancellor (1918–1923) and vicar general of the archdiocese. He became a domestic prelate in February 1924.

Bishop of Duluth 
On December 17, 1925, Welch was appointed the third bishop of the Diocese of Duluth by Pope Pius XI. He received his episcopal consecration on February 3, 1926, from Archbishop Dowling, with Bishops James O'Reilly and Joseph Busch serving as co-consecrators. During his 33-year tenure, Welch remedied the financial crisis in the diocese and also constructed the Cathedral of Our Lady of the Rosary.

Thomas Welch on September 8, 1959, at age 74.

References

1884 births
1959 deaths
Roman Catholic Archdiocese of Saint Paul and Minneapolis
Roman Catholic bishops of Duluth
University of St. Thomas (Minnesota) alumni
20th-century Roman Catholic bishops in the United States